Kim Kwang-Hyok (born January 22, 1988, in Nampo) is a North Korean long-distance runner. At the 2012 Summer Olympics, he competed in the Men's marathon, finishing in 53rd place.

References

North Korean male long-distance runners
North Korean male marathon runners
Living people
Olympic athletes of North Korea
Athletes (track and field) at the 2012 Summer Olympics
1988 births
People from Nampo